The Review of Civil Litigation Costs, or Jackson Review or Jackson Proposals, is a review of civil litigation costs in England and Wales conducted by  Lord Justice Jackson in 2009, the final report, known as the Jackson Report, which was presented in January 2010.

History
The senior judiciary were concerned about the cost of civil justice in England and Wales, in particular because the costs were often disproportionate to the issues, and in late 2008 the Master of the Rolls, Lord Clarke of Stone-cum-Ebony asked Lord Justice Jackson to conduct a review into civil litigation costs.
The review became known as the Jackson Review.

It commenced in January 2009 and took about a year to complete, a preliminary report being published on 8 May 2009. On 14 January 2010, Jackson published the final report to the new Master of the Rolls, Lord Neuberger.

Assessors
Jackson was assisted in his work by a panel of assessors comprising: 
 Mr Justice Cranston
 Professor Paul Fenn, Head of Industrial Economics at Nottingham University Business School
 Senior Costs Judge Master Peter Hurst
 Jeremy Morgan QC
 Michael Napier QC
 Andrew Parker (who replaced Lord Hunt, who had to resign early in the review for health reasons )
 Colin Stutt,  Head of Funding at the Legal Services Commission

Findings
The final report is 557 pages long.

The main findings and recommendations include:
The costs system should be based on legal expenses that reflect the nature/complexity of the case.
Success fees and after the event insurance premiums should not be recoverable in no win, no fee cases.
 General damages awards for personal injuries and other civil wrongs should be increased by 10%.
 Referral fees should be scrapped.
 Claimants should only make a small contribution to defendant costs if a claim is unsuccessful (as long as they have behaved reasonably).
There should be fixed costs for "fast track" cases (with a claim up to £25,000).
 A Costs Council should be established to annually review fixed costs and lawyers' hourly rates.
Lawyers should be allowed to enter into Contingency Fee Agreements.
"Before the event’ legal insurance should be promoted.

Follow-up
After the Jackson Report was published, the Judicial Executive Board agreed to support the recommendations of the final report and established a Judicial Steering Group with the following members:
Lord Neuberger, Master of the Rolls
Lord Justice Kay, Chairman of the Judicial Studies Board
Lord Justice Moore-Bick, Deputy Head of Civil Justice

References

External links
 Official site for download of final and preliminary reports

English civil law
2009 in British law
2010 in British law
Legal costs
Reports of the United Kingdom government